Pilibhit is a city and a municipal board of Pilibhit district in the Indian state of Uttar Pradesh. Pilibhit is the north-easternmost district of Bareilly division, situated in the Rohilkhand region of the sub-Himalayan Plateau belt next to foothills of Sivalik Range on the boundary of Nepal, known for the origin of river Gomati and one of the most forest-rich areas in North India. Pilibhit was also known as Bansuri Nagari – the land of flutes, for making and exporting roughly 95% of India's flutes.

According to a report issued by the Government of India, Pilibhit is one of the Minority Concentrated Areas in India based on the 2001 census data on population, socio-economic indicators, and basic amenities indicators. Though separated only by a short distance from the outer ranges of the Himalayas, Pilibhit consists entirely of a level plain, containing depressions but no hills and is intersected by several streams. Pilibhit is one of the forest-rich areas of Uttar Pradesh, which has very high tourism potential. The almost 54 km-long Indo-Nepal international border makes Pilibhit a highly sensitive for security purposes. According to an estimate by the Government of India, Pilibhit has 45.23% of its population living under the poverty line. Increasing population and unemployment is a cause of worry in the area, and many non-governmental organizations (NGOs) and government-run organizations have initiated projects to provide employment, but human resources are yet to be exploited in full. The city came third-bottom in terms of hygiene and sanitation in a Government ranking list of 423 towns and cities in India.

Pilibhit was in the news at the national level because of a few man-killer sub-adult tigers, which has caused fear in the whole area in and around the forest. By August 2010, the cat had killed and partially eaten eight people.

History 
Pilibhit forests area are a home for the striped cats, tiger, bear, and many species of birds. A proposal, created in 2005, to make a home for the endangered cats in Pilibhit forests was sent to the government of India in April 2008.  was declared in September 2008 based on its special type of ecosystem with vast open spaces and sufficient feed for the elegant predators.

It is believed by locals that Pilibhit was ruled by an ancient king named Mayurdhwaj or Moredhwaj or King Venu, a great devotee of lord Krishna and a loyal friend of Arjun.  King Venu's name and the geography of his kingdom can be traced in the Hindu epic Mahabharat.

The city Pilibhit was an administrative unit in the Mughal era under Bareilly suba.  For security, the Mughal subedar Ali Mohammed Khan constructed four magnificent gates around the administrative building in 1734  AD. These gates were named Barellwi Darwaza at the west, Hussaini Darwaza at the east, Jahanabadi Darwaza at the north and Dakhini Darwaza at the south.  Because of a lack of proper maintenance, all the gates have been lost; only their ruins remain. He also constructed a Jama Masjid in Pilibhit.

The last king of the Shah dynasty of Doti, Nepal, Prithvipati Shah, was sheltered in Pilibhit by the ruler of Rampur State Faizullah Khan in 1789 AD, after being attacked by the Gorkha Kingdom of Nepal.

The freedom fighter Maulana Inayatullah, from Pilibhit, voluntarily hosted the exiled Queen of Avadh, Begum Hazrat Mahal, who reached Nepal in late 1859.

Transportation

Pilibhit Junction railway station

Pilibhit Junction railway station is well connected with Bareilly Tanakpur Shahjahanpur Mathura . It is not connected with many cities of india like Agra Kanpur Varanasi Prayagraj Mumbai Ujjain Indore Kota Jaipur Ajmer Surat Aligarh Rampur Gorakhpur Jhansi Haridwar Kathgodam Dehradun Etc. 

 Pilibhit UPSRTC Bus Depot

Pilibhit UPSRTC Buses well connected with Bareilly Tanakpur Delhi Shahjahanpur. Pilibhit UPSRTC buses is not well connected with Rudrpur Dehradun Lucknow Lakhimpur Aligarh

Geography
Pilibhit lies between the parallels of 28°64' and 29°53' north latitude and the meridians of 79°57' and 81°37' east longitude covering an area of 68.76 km2. The north side of Pilibhit is bordered by Udham Singh Nagar of Uttarakhand state and by the territory of Nepal. Shahjahanpur lies on the south side Pilibhit. The east of Pilibhit is flanked for a short distance by Lakhimpur Kheri and the remaining distance is swathed by the Shahjahanpur. The western limit touches the limits of Bareilly.

According to the Central Statistical Organisation, the district Pilibhit had an area of 3504 km2 on 1 September 2007, occupying 46th position in the state and the total area of the Pilibhit city is 68.76 km2.  Pilibhit city, with 2365.11 people per square kilometer, is more densely populated than the rest of the district, which has 469.51 people per km2.

The area has diverse features, and topographically may be divided into several distinct tracts. In the north and north-west, the tract is a continuation of the Terai. The southern portion of the Bisalpur tehsil is similar in most respect to the adjacent tract of Bareilly and Shahjahanpur. The eastern and smaller section approximates rather to undeveloped forest areas of Lakhimpur Kheri, though with the spread of cultivation the dissimilarity between Puranpur and the rest of the area is gradually becoming less marked. There are 1216 villages within Pilibhit's limits, of which 982 are electrified.  The area has more than ten small to medium-sized rivers and nine small to medium-sized water bodies. The origin of river Gomti, Gumti or Gomati, which is a tributary of the Ganges River, is from a small lake, Gomat Taal, situated in Madhotanda in the Puranpur Tehsil region.

Pilibhit city also has a few water bodies in its limits, one being on Tanakpur road in front of the Dramond college gate, another being at the Chauraha degree college. Every year during winter, the Chauraha water body attracts thousands of migratory birds. The main source of water in the district is the groundwater and the canals. District Pilibhit is swathed by a big net of canals. The district has six main feeders or canals, which run through almost 138  km in the district.
The northeastern boundary of the reserve is the Sharda River (Nepali: Mahakali River) which defines the Indo-Nepal border, while the southwest boundary is marked by the River Sharda and the River Ghaghara. The reserve has a core zone area of 602.79 km2 (232.74 sq mi) and a buffer zone area of 127.45 km2 (49.21 sq mi). Elevation ranges from 168 to 175 meters above mean sea level.
  The major part of Pilibhit District is covered by dense forest. Total 784.572 km2 is forest. Till 1978, 63% area of the district was a dense forest, but deforestation has reduced the total forest cover to 22.39% in 2004. The Sharda canal is the main canal of the district, the others being its branches. The total length of canals in the district is 138 km. Apart from the canal system, the district also has a few water bodies, which are being used for agriculture purposes.

National Highway No. 74 runs through the district connecting Haridwar to Bareilly via Kichha, Kashipur and Nagina city.

The district Pilibhit also has several places of religious importance in or around the district. A main gurudwara of the Sikh community is located in Nanakmatta town around 46 km from the city.

Demographics

As of the 2011 India census, District Pilibhit had a population of 2,037,225. Pilibhit district is the 46th most populous Districts of Uttar Pradesh. Pilibhit City has  people. Males constitute 52.94% of the population and females 47.06%. Pilibhit has an average literacy rate of 63.58%, lower than the national average of 74.04%. Male literacy is 73.46%, and female literacy is 52.43%. In Pilibhit, 14.58% of the population is under 6 years of age.

Studies reveal that the poverty level in the district is associated with the social identity, source of livelihood, landless and level of education of the head of the household. Education is a crucial instrument for raising income levels of people and moving out of the vicious circle of poverty. A study done by Delhi-based NGO, Nav Bharat Nirman indicates a strong correlation between educational attainment and poverty levels among various social classes in the district. The incidence of poverty is much higher among scheduled castes (SC) and scheduled tribes (ST) households in Pilibhit. Nearly 60 percent of SC households were below the poverty line in Pilibhit in 1999–2000. However, this proportion came down to 45.23 percent in 2007–08.

Climate
Pilibhit experiences winter from November to February. It experiences pleasant windy days, clear skies and cool nights from November to the end of February. Rain is very expected in February.

Reported climatic variations:

Etymology
According to the Imperial Gazetteer of India, Pilibhit was once known as Hafizabad after the Rohila leader of the area, Hafiz Rahmat Khan, but later took its current name from a nearby village. According to a document from the British Library, 'the city Pilibhit' existed in the late 18th century (1770–1780) when Marathas invaded the Rohilkhand region. With this invasion, the Kurmi community came to this region and over time, the city Pilibhit enlarged it boundaries.

Another evidence of the city's existence is found in Nepali literature, which mentions a city named as Pilibhit, which provided shelter to the last king of the Shah dynasty, Deepa Shah, who was attacked by the Gorakha king in 1789 AD.

Sports
Lalit Hari Sugar Factory Stadium
 
Lalit Hari Sugar Factory Stadium is mainly used for cricket. It was established in 1931. It has a matting type of pitch. This stadium had hosted a few Ranji trophy cricket matches in the early 1980s. Lalit Hari sugar factory stadium is located in the Shri Lalit Hari sugar mill compound.

Gandhi Stadium

This stadium is under control of Government. This stadium is mainly used for Hockey, Football, and Karate Training. This stadium is located on Gandhi Road so it is called Gandhi Stadium.

Various educational institutions have their Ground, including DGIC ground, St. Aloysius ground, Rama college ground, and SVM college ground. The City teams have produced many national level athletes who represented themselves at national tournaments and different events and have won a few state level and national level competitions on various events.

Economy
The main crop in the district is sugarcane and there is a sugar factory in the city. According to an article published in Hindustan Times, by a 1991 estimate, 95% of India's flutes were manufactured in Pilibhit. The craftsmen were used to source its bamboo from Barak Valley in Assam. Earlier, there was an unbroken narrow-gauge line running from Silchar, in Assam, via Bihar, and into Pilibhit. On this line, 60-strong bundles of bamboo, each stalk 10  ft long, used to make their way to Pilibhit, but around 15 years ago, sections of that line were removed. Now, the bamboo has to travel on the narrow gauge from Silchar to Jiribum, then shift onto a broad-gauge line to travel to Bareilly, the nearest big town, and then reloaded onto narrow gauge to come into Pilibhit.

Communication and media

Pilibhit has one local Radio Station (Akashwani) at 100.1  MHz but it also receives Bareilly's FM signals of following Radio providers:

 Print media

The Hindi daily newspapers include Dainik Jagran, Amar Ujala, and The Hindustan. Prominent English dailies like The Times of India, The Hindustan Times and Indian Express have fewer readers. Among lesser-known Hindi papers are Swatantra Bharat, Rashtriya Sahara, and Jansatta. The Hindi newspapers Dainik Jagran and Amar Ujala have their offices in the city.

Civic administration
The Pilibhit Nagar Palika Parishad (PNPP) is the largest municipal board in the Pilibhit district, in charge of the civic and infrastructural assets of the city of Pilibhit. This municipal board was established in 1865.

References

Further reading

External links

 Official Web Site
 Pilibhit city guide
 Government Of Uttar Pradesh – Official Web Site
Pilibhit Tiger Reserve

 
Cities and towns in Pilibhit district
Rohilkhand
Bareilly division
Cities in Uttar Pradesh